Hilary Green (born 29 December 1951) is a British former competitive ice dancer. With her skating partner, Glyn Watts, she became the 1974 World silver medalist and a two-time European silver medalist (1974, 1975). They represented Great Britain at the 1976 Winter Olympics, where they placed 7th.

In 1973, they competed at the inaugural Skate Canada International and won the event.

Competitive highlights 
(with Watts)

References

1951 births
British female ice dancers
Figure skaters at the 1976 Winter Olympics
Olympic figure skaters of Great Britain
Living people
World Figure Skating Championships medalists
European Figure Skating Championships medalists